"The Jamestown Ferry" is a song composed by Bobby Borchers and Mack Vickery. It was originally recorded and released as a single by American country artist, Tanya Tucker. The track was issued as a double A-side single in conjunction with "Love's the Answer" in October 1972. The singles both reached the top five of the American country chart and the top of the Canadian country chart. It was also included on Tucker's debut album called Delta Dawn.

Background and recording
Tanya Tucker was 13 years old when she signed her first recording contract to Columbia Records. Her first single was 1972's "Delta Dawn", which became a top ten country song in North America. She would follow the song with a series of top ten (and later) number one country recordings. Her follow-up release would be "Love's the Answer". Included on the other side of "Love's the Answer" was a song called "The Jamestown Ferry". The tune was composed by Bobby Borchers and Mack Vickery. The track was recorded at the Columbia Studio in Nashville, Tennessee. The session was held in July 1972.

Release and chart performance
"The Jamestown Ferry" was first included on Tucker's debut album in September 1972 titled Delta Dawn. In conjunction with "Love's the Answer", "The Jamestown Ferry" was issued as a double A-side single by Columbia Records in October 1972. Both singles were counted with the same chart positions. Spending 13 weeks on the American Billboard Hot Country Songs chart, "Love's the Answer"/"The Jamestown Ferry" peaked at number five by February 1973. On the Canadian RPM Country chart, the singles became her first to reach the number one spot.

Track listing
7" double A-side vinyl single
 "Love's the Answer" – 2:34
 "The Jamestown Ferry" – 2:53

Chart performance

References

1972 singles
1972 songs
Columbia Records singles
Song recordings produced by Billy Sherrill
Tanya Tucker songs